Collector Car Appreciation Day (CCAD) is an annual celebration to raise awareness of the role automotive restoration and collection plays in American society. The day was first recognized on July 9, 2010 due, in part, to U.S. Senate resolution S. Res 513, sponsored by Senators Jon Tester (D-MT) and Richard Burr (R-NC).

Hundreds of events were staged nationwide to celebrate the first CCAD. Thousands attended events ranging from car cruises and shows to small-business open houses and “drive your car to work” displays. The effort was organized by the Specialty Equipment Market Association (SEMA) and its Automotive Restoration Market Organization (ARMO) and Hot Rod Industry Alliance (HRIA) Councils, acknowledged the importance of the automobile in American culture as the inspiration for much music, literature, photography, cinema, fashion and other artistic pursuits.

The SEMA Action Network (SAN), SEMA’s grassroots enthusiast network maintains a list of scheduled events to commemorate Collector Car Appreciation Day.

Previous Dates

References

 https://web.archive.org/web/20110725121736/http://www.aftermarketnews.com/Item/75220/thousands_to_gather_to_celebrate_firstever_collector_car_appreciation_day.aspx

External links
 SEMA.org
 SEMA Action Network
 Collector Car Appreciation Day
 tirebusiness.com
 Hawaii Resolution 
 govtrack.us

Automotive events
July observances
Holidays and observances by scheduling (varies)
Conservation and restoration of vehicles